Lynch is a surname of English and Irish origin.

English origin
In England, the surname is derived from the Norman-French de Lench and Kentish hlinc (meaning 'Hill').

A Lynch family originated at Cranbrook in Kent (where William Lynch co-founded Cranbrook School, Kent, in 1518) and from Tudor times were seated at "The Groves" in the village of Staple near Canterbury in Kent (the house was demolished in 1843 on the death of Lady Lynch). Their coat of arms consist of Three Lynxes Rampant and most of the family are buried at the Lynch Chancel in Staple parish church. Notable members of this family include:

 The Right Honourable Simon Lynch, Squire of "The Groves" at Staple and member of parliament for Sandwich (1495-1573)
Sir Thomas Lynch, Governor of British Jamaica 
Dr John Lynch, Dean and Archdeacon of Canterbury Cathedral, and Squire of "The Groves" at Staple, who married a daughter of William Wake, Archbishop of Canterbury, 
Sir William Lynch, Squire of "The Groves" at Staple, diplomat, art collector and member of parliament for Canterbury

Irish origin
There are several different unrelated Irish families of which Lynch is the anglicized form, including: 
 Ó Loingsigh, meaning "descendant of Loingseach" (having or belonging to a fleet of ships), which was anglicized as Lynchy, Lynskey and Lindsey. According to early twentieth century genealogical authority, the Rev Patrick Wolfe, there were several different kindreds with this name in early medieval Ireland. One group were amongst the lords of the kingdom of Dál Riata in north-eastern Ulster during the 11th century until they were displaced by the Normans. Other Ó Loingsigh families were to be found in Tipperary, Briefne (modern day Leitrim) and Thomond (present day Clare and Limerick). In West Cork, a group of Ó Loingsigh were a branch of the Corca Laoighe.
 Mac Loingsigh – Clynch, Lynch, Mac Glinchy, MacClintock, McClinton
 Mac Loingseacháin – Lynchseanaun, Lynch
 de Lench, an Anglo-Norman name, which became one of the Tribes of Galway. It is this wealthy landowning line that Patrick Lynch, who moved to Argentina, was from.

See also
 Cruithin
 Kings of Dál nAraidi
 Lynch leaders of Galway

References

Further reading
 Genealogy from 17th century Spanish university mentioning Lynch links between Galway and Meath (page 15)

Surnames
Occupational surnames
English-language surnames
Surnames of Irish origin
Irish royal families
Ulaid